Eupleura tampaensis is a species of sea snail, a marine gastropod mollusk in the family Muricidae, the murex snails or rock snails.

Description
The length of the shell attains 25 mm.

Distribution
This marine species occurs off Florida.

References

External links
 Barco, A.; Herbert, G.; Houart, R.; Fassio, G. & Oliverio, M. (2017). A molecular phylogenetic framework for the subfamily Ocenebrinae (Gastropoda, Muricidae). Zoologica Scripta. 46 (3): 322-335
 WMSD: Eupleura tampaensis

Muricidae
Gastropods described in 1846